Beatriz Bracher (born August 7, 1961) is a Brazilian writer.

Bracher was born in São Paulo, and studied Brazilian and Portuguese Literature at the Pontifical Catholic Universities of São Paulo and Rio de Janeiro. She was the founder and editor of the literary magazine 34 Letras from 1988 to 1991 and of Editora 34 publishing house, from 1992 to 2000. Bracher's first novel, Azul e Dura, was published in 2002. Her novel Anatomia do Paraíso (2015) won the São Paulo Prize for Literature and Rio Prize for Literature.

Bracher wrote the screenplay for the films Cronicamente Inviável (2000), Os Inquilinos (2009, Best Screenplay award at Festival do Rio) and O Abismo Prateado (2011).

Published books

Novels
 2002 - Azul e Dura
 2004 - Não Falei (English translation: I Didn't Talk, translated by Adam Morris, New Directions Publishing, 2018 )
 2007 - Antonio (translation in progress. English, New Directions; Italian: Utopia)
 2015 - Anatomia do Paraíso

Short stories
 2009 - Meu Amor
 2013 - Garimpo

References

1961 births
Living people
Brazilian screenwriters
Writers from São Paulo
21st-century Brazilian women writers
21st-century Brazilian writers
21st-century screenwriters
Brazilian women screenwriters